Oleh Humenyuk (born 3 May 1983, Odessa, Ukrainian SSR) is a professional Ukrainian football midfielder who played for Zhemchuzhyna Odesa.

Career 
Humenyuk moved to Chornomorets in October 2007 from FC Sheriff Tiraspol. With Sheriff, Humenyuk won the Divizia Naţională championship five times, Moldovan Cup 3 times, and the Moldovan Super Cup 3 times. He appeared for Sheriff 193 times and scored 12 goals. He was also capped 10 times by the Ukraine U-21 team.

He played for Volyn Lutsk in the Ukrainian Premier League.

Honours
Sheriff Tiraspol
 Moldovan National Division: (6) 2001–02, 2002–03, 2003–04, 2004–05, 2005–06, 2006–07
 Moldovan Cup: (2) 2001–02, 2005–06
 Moldovan Super Cup: (3) 2003, 2004, 2005
 CIS Cup: (1) 2003

Individual
 Top Scorer of Moldovan Super Cup

External links 
 

1983 births
Living people
Ukrainian footballers
Ukrainian expatriate footballers
Expatriate footballers in Moldova
FC Sheriff Tiraspol players
FC Chornomorets Odesa players
SC Tavriya Simferopol players
Ukrainian Premier League players
FC Volyn Lutsk players
Ukrainian expatriate sportspeople in Moldova
FC TSK Simferopol players
CSF Bălți players
FC Zhemchuzhyna Odesa players
Crimean Premier League players
Association football midfielders
Footballers from Odesa